The Columbia University Record, subtitled "news and ideas for the Columbia community", is the official newspaper of the Columbia University administration. Its first issue, under the title The University Record was issued in September 1973; it took its present name in July 1975. It has been published roughly biweekly or monthly during academic terms. 

Former writers for the Columbia University Record include Jo Kadlecek. Former managing editor is Amy Callahan.

Notes

External links 

 Official archive

Columbia University
Newspapers published in New York City
Culture of Columbia University